The Duquesne Athletic Club was a professional ice hockey team based in Pittsburgh, Pennsylvania that played for only one season in 1908–1909.  It won the final championship of the Western Pennsylvania Hockey League (WPHL).

History
In 1908, the newly organized Duquesne Athletic Club (DAC) entered a hockey team in the WPHL for what turned out to be the league's final season of 1908–09. The club secured future Hall of Famer Alf Smith to captain the team and choose its players. Though unable to retain Smith for more than a small part of the season, the DAC finished with a 10–4–1 record to win the league title. The championship came down to the last game of the season in which Duquesne beat the Pittsburgh Bankers 4–2.

Three of the team's players, Harry McRobie, Tom Westwick and Joe Dennison, jumped their contracts in mid-season to play in Canada but soon changed their minds and returned to the DAC. For this reason, the team was nicknamed the "Prodigals".

References to uniform color are in reports of a game played December 19, 1908; the team was referred to in one newspaper as the "brown and white artists" and in another as the "maroon jersey wearers".

References

Ice hockey teams in Pittsburgh
Defunct ice hockey teams in Pennsylvania
Defunct Pittsburgh sports teams
Western Pennsylvania Hockey League teams
1908 establishments in Pennsylvania
1909 disestablishments in Pennsylvania
Ice hockey clubs established in 1908
Sports clubs disestablished in 1909